Giovanni Cardinal Paparoni (sometimes known in English as John Cardinal Paparo; died ca. 1153/1154) was an Italian Cardinal and prominent papal legate in dealings with Ireland and Scotland.

He was created Cardinal by Pope Celestine II in 1143. He presided at the Synod of Kells in 1152, which decided the system of four archbishops (Armagh, Dublin, Cashel, and Tuam) for Ireland. He argued for a reduction in the number of bishops.

Notes

12th-century Italian cardinals
Christianity in medieval Ireland